Andrej Mangold (born 14 January 1987) is a German professional basketball player who plays for RheinStars Köln of the German Basketball League (Basketball Bundesliga).

Personal life
Mangold was born Hanover Germany and is of African-American and Latvian descent.

References

External links
 Eurocup Profile
 German BBL Profile
 Eurobasket.com Profile

1987 births
Living people
Artland Dragons players
German men's basketball players
German people of African-American descent
German people of Latvian descent
Point guards
s.Oliver Würzburg players
Skyliners Frankfurt players
RheinStars Köln players
Sportspeople from Hanover
Telekom Baskets Bonn players